The eleventh season of Dancing with the Stars premiered on Sunday 8 May 2011 at 6:30 pm on Channel Seven. Daniel MacPherson and Sonia Kruger returned as hosts, along with judges Todd McKenney and Helen Richey. Australian dancer Joshua Horner joined the judging panel as a replacement for Mark Wilson. My Kitchen Rules presenter Manu Feildel and his partner, Alana Patience, won the competition over model Haley Bracken. Alana is the first professional to win the competition twice, having won the prior season with Rob Palmer.

Background 
The cast for the season were revealed in early April 2011, along with their professional partners. During this time, it was announced that Mark Wilson was dumped from the judging panel by the Seven Network. On 29 April 2011, it was announced that Australian dancer Joshua Horner would replace Wilson as a judge. The season premiered on 8 May 2011 at 6:30pm on Channel Seven.

Couples

Scoring Chart
Red numbers indicate the lowest score for each week.
Green numbers indicate the highest score for each week.
 indicates the couple eliminated that week.
 indicates the returning couple that finished in the bottom two.
 indicates the returning couple that was the last to be called safe (they may or may not have been in the bottom two).
 indicates the winning couple.
 indicates the runner-up couple.
 indicates the third-place couple.

Notes:

Week 1: Each couple performed either the Cha-Cha-Cha or the Viennese Waltz. Manu Feildel received the highest score of the night with 25/30 for his Viennese Waltz. Mark Occhilupo performed the Cha-Cha-Cha and received the lowest score with 7/30 and the second 1 from Todd McKinney after David Graham in Season 6. Fourteen-year-old Jack Vidgen from Australia's Got Talent performed part of Whitney Houston's "I Have Nothing", following Samantha Armytage and Brendon Midson's performance of the Viennese Waltz to the same song. Irish singer Ronan Keating performed his new single "Walk On By".

Week 2: All couples that danced the Cha-Cha-Cha in the previous week danced the Foxtrot, and those who danced the Viennese Waltz danced the Jive. Damien Leith received three 9's, and the highest score of the night for his foxtrot, scoring 27/30. Brynne Edelsten received the lowest score, earning a 14/30 for her foxtrot. Despite being third on the judges leaderboard with a 22/30 for her jive, Jan Stephenson was in the bottom two, along with Nathan Bracken who scored an 18/30. Nathan Bracken and his partner Masha Belash were the first couple eliminated.

Week 3: All couples danced either a Samba, Waltz or Argentine Tango. All of the couples which had the samba struggled a lot, while those with the Argentine tango achieved good scores. Manu Feildel received the highest score of the night for his Argentine tango, scoring 27/30. Samantha Armytage and Brendon Midson received the lowest score of the night, with 15/30 for their samba. Oscar Award-winning singer and actress Jennifer Hudson performed two songs, singer James Blunt also performed his new song, and Australian icon Olivia Newton-John provided special commentary on all the dances. Lara and Carmello received their highest scores so far (and the second highest score of the night), but found herself in the bottom two with Jan Stephenson. Golfing legend Jan Stephenson and her partner Mark Hodge were the second couple eliminated.

Week 4: All couples danced either the Rumba or the Quickstep. Haley Bracken received the first ten of the series from judge Todd McKenney, also gaining the highest score of the night, with a 28/30. Samantha Armytage received the lowest score of the night for a second week in a row, scoring an 11/30 for her rumba. Jessica Mauboy and Stan Walker performed their latest duet hit, entitled What Happened To Us?. Daniel Ewing and Luda Kroiter were in the bottom two, along with Mark and Jade. After scoring second lowest on the leaderboard, retired professional surfer Mark Occhilupo and his partner Jade Brand were the third couple eliminated.

Week 5: Each couple performed an unlearned dance to the theme of popular TV show. Frontrunners Damien Leith and Haley Bracken both tied for the top spot, each scoring a 26/30 for their respective jives. Brynne Edelsten received the lowest score of the night, an 11/30, with an I Dream of Jeannie themed samba. Brian McFadden performed his new single, That's How Life Goes. Because of her low scores, socialite Brynne Edelsten and her partner Arsen Kishishian were in the bottom two, along with Dan and Luda. After being in the bottom two last week, Home and Away actor Daniel Ewing and his partner Luda Kroiter became the fourth couple eliminated.

Week 6: Each couple performed an unlearned rock themed dance, as well as a rock and roll marathon dance. Haley Bracken received the highest first round score, a 27/30, despite receiving criticism from Todd McKenney over her previous dance experience. Once again, Brynne Edelsten received the lowest first round score, with a 13/30. During the rock and roll marathon, Carmello dropped Lara, which led to them being eliminated first. Eventually, Manu and Alana were the winners of the dance, and received an additional 10 points added to their first round score. American Idol winner Carrie Underwood performed her new single, Undo It. Lara Bingle and Brynne Edelsten were both in the bottom two, each of them being in the bottom two twice so far. Socialite Brynne Edelsten and her partner Arsen Kishishian became the fifth couple eliminated.

Week 7: The men versed the women tonight in the second round of competition. Nick Bracks scored the lowest in the first round, receiving a 12/30 for his quickstep, after forgetting most of his routine. Damien Leith received the first perfect score of the season, a 30/30 for his Argentine tango. In the second round, the male cha-cha-cha beat the women, 27/30 to 24/30. Hip-Hop artist Wynter Gordon performed her new song, Til Death, accompanied by her dance troupe. Haley Bracken and Aric Yegudkin found themselves in the bottom two for the first time, along with Nick Bracks and Jessica Raffa. Male model and son of political icon Steve Bracks, Nick Bracks and his partner Jessica Raffa became the sixth couple eliminated.

Week 8: Each couple had to perform an unlearned ballroom and Latin dance. For the Latin dances, each couple was only given their music 30 minutes prior to dancing. Haley and Aric received the second perfect score of the season, gaining a 30/30 for their quickstep, putting them in first place in round one. Samantha and Lara both shared the bottom spot with 19/30 apiece. Lara received scrutiny from the judges following an interview video taken from the previous week, which showed Lara criticizing judge Todd McKenney's comments for her Paso Doble and team dance. After the instant Latin dances, Haley once again received the highest score, with a 28/30, and Samantha received the lowest, an 18/30. Manu and Alana were in the bottom two for the first time, shared with Lara and Carmello, who had been in the bottom two a total of three times. Australian fashion model and media personality Lara Bingle and her partner Carmello Pizzino were the seventh couple eliminated.

Week 9: Each couple performed their final unlearned ballroom and Latin dances. At the end of round one, Haley and Aric were in first place, scoring another perfect 30/30 for their Waltz. Samantha and Brendon were at the bottom with a 17/30 for their Waltz. Haley and Aric also topped the leaderboard in round two, scoring a 28/30 for their Paso doble, while Samantha and Brendon also scored the lowest, with an 18/30 for their Paso Doble. The final four couples then had to compete in a Winner Takes All Cha-Cha-Cha, the winner of which would receive an additional 15 points to their score. Manu and Alana won the Cha-Cha-Cha contest, and ended up with a total of 64/75, topping the leaderboard. Seven Newsreader and frequent low scorer of the series, Samantha Armytage and her partner Brendon Midson finished the competition in fourth place.

Week 10: Each couple performed a dance deemed their "Redemption Dance" by the judges. Manu Feildel received the highest first round score, with a 28/30 for his foxtrot. Damien Leith scored the lowest, with a 23/30 for his samba. Darren Hayes performed a song from his former band Savage Garden, Truly, Madly, Deeply. All of the eliminated couples returned to dance again, with the exception of Nathan Bracken, who, while returning, could not dance, as he was incurring a neck injury. Haley Bracken received her third perfect score in the Cha-Cha-Cha face off, having an overall total of 57/60 for the night. Singer/Australian Idol Winner Damien Leith and his partner Melanie Hooper finished the competition in third place. Darren Hayes performed his new single, "Talk, Talk, Talk". Then Hayley& Aric and Manu & Alan were left to battle it out Manu scored the highest with 30/30 as he finished up his final total for all three dances was 85/90 Hayley's freestyle disappointed the judges saying the didn't get the story giving her 25/30 as she finished up with 82/90. Manu and Alana were announced the winners of dancing with the stars 2011 placing Hayley and Aric the runners-up of the series as their freestyle let them down.

Dance schedule
The celebrities and professional partners will dance one of these routines for each corresponding week.

Week 1 : Cha-Cha-Cha or Viennese Waltz
Week 2 : Jive or Foxtrot
Week 3 : Argentine Tango, Waltz or Samba
Week 4 : Rumba or Quickstep
Week 5 : One unlearned dance (TV Theme Week)
Week 6 : One unlearned dance, Swing elimination dance off (Rock 'n' Roll Theme Week)
Week 7 : One unlearned dance, Males vs. Females Team Cha-Cha-Cha
Week 8 : One unlearned ballroom and Instant Latin dance
Week 9 : Two unlearned dances, winner takes all Cha-cha-cha
Week 10 : Judge's pick Redemption dance, Sudden Death Cha-Cha-Cha, Freestyle

Dance chart 
   
   
 Highest scoring dance
 Lowest scoring dance
 Performed but not scored

This dance was repeated by the couple at the finale.

Highest and lowest scoring performances 
The best and worst performances in each dance according to the judges' marks are as follows:

Average Chart

The average chart only includes single-couple dances scored on the traditional 30-point scale.

Couples' Highest and Lowest Scoring Dances

According to the traditional 30-point scale.

Running Order
Unless indicated otherwise, individual judges scores in the chart below (given in parentheses) are listed in this order from left to right: Todd McKenney, Helen Richey, Joshua Horner.

Week 1 

Running order

Week 2 

Running order

Week 3 

Running order

Week 4 

Running order

Week 5 

Running order

Week 6 

Running order

Week 7 

Running order

Week 8 
Running order

Week 9 
Running order

Winner Take All Cha-Cha-Cha

Week 10 
Running order

Guest performances

Reception

Viewership

References 

Season 11
2011 Australian television seasons